Shantou Jinshan Middle School is located in Queshi Scenic Area, Shantou City, Guangdong Province, China, covering 107,000 square meters. There are 60 high school classes with approximately 3400 students and more than 210 full-time teachers. School supervision and evaluation of a model high school in Guangdong Province early in June 2006 by, and in October the following year by a high school teaching level assessment in Guangdong Province as well as the model high school in Guangdong Province Steering acceptance confirmation.

History

1877－1911 

In 1877, the Chaoshan Chief General Fang Yao spent huge sums of money to build Jinshan College, under the auspices of the Chaozhou famous gentleman Kuo Ting-yee set, in Chaozhou Jinshan top. The beginning of the run of the college is positioned to Chaozhou, the highest institution of the House under the jurisdiction of the official school. According to available data, in 1901, the College sent to participate in examinations held of the hygienist year, held 28 people, the first in the province. So it enjoys a high reputation in the community.

In December 1887, the Governor Zhang Zhidong of Guangdong and Guangxi inspected the college, during the inspections Chaozhou Jinshan library building initiative Bijian. In 1903, Jinshan College transformed into Chaozhou in school, Wen Zhonghe served as the total mannequin of the school, reform of teaching content and teaching methods. Mathematics, foreign language and gymnastics courses opened in the school. From 1904 to 1908,  the Chaozhou middle school halls also offer the Normal School to train a small school teacher. East-meets-education, is the Yeongdong regional initiatives of its kind.

1912－1923 
In 1912, the school changed its name to the Provincial Chaozhou Middle School, the school system for four years; in 1913, but also changed its name to Guangdong Chaozhou Jinshan Middle School. During the May Fourth Movement, the students Yu Xinyi was elected chairman of the Federation of the Chaozhou students Salvation Association. In the spring of 1921, Zhang Jingsheng served as principal, implemented a series of education reforms(In violation of the interests of the local gentry, as well as a distinct anti-traditional reforms, Zhang Jingsheng is squeezed, and eventually resigned from the principal duties and to Peking University began to teach philosophy).1921 Li Chuntao subject to the appointment of Zhang Jingsheng, as a school superintendent. Li Chuntao, founder and editor of gold in the monthly evolution ", to promote socialist doctrine; exclude parties resistance and Zhang Jingsheng, eight girls enrolled in the 1921 period exam.The end of September 1921, resigned from the principal duties of Zhang Jingsheng, Li Chuntao took the President's powers, continue to advance reform.In 1922, the Kuomintang Government on secondary education reform, ordinary secondary schools to implement thirty-three segmented educational system, secondary schools divided into junior and senior high two stages.The School implemented three years of the middle and three years of high school educational system.

1923－1949 
In 1923, the school was renamed the Guangdong Provincial Fourth Middle School. In November 13, 1925 leaders of the National Government Chiang Kai-shek, Russian higher military advisers Ke Luo felt the husband General, the Secretary-General Shao Lizi more than ten people visited the Guangdong Provincial Fourth Middle School. Chiang Kai-shek made the report "Students Are The Masters Of The School" to the teachers and students.In 1935, the school changed its name to the Guangdong Provincial Jinshan Middle School.On August 31, 1938, the Japanese air attacks [Chaoan], Jinshan top campus was bombed.Teachers and students were evacuated to the Fengtang Town Qiyuan Village, and studied in Zhiyong School。In late June 1939, the school temporarily closed.

At the end of 1940, the Guangdong provincial government decided to re-commissioning Jinshan secondary schools, appointment of Zhan Zhaoqing for principals. In the spring of 1941, the school announced the re-commissioning in Fenghuang Chaozhou. Move back to the Chaozhou City from Fenghuang on December 31, 1945 by Kaiyuan Temple for the temporary classroom lessons. In the summer of 1949, high school from the Kaiyuan Temple moved back to the newly constructed teaching buildings in the Jinshan top class. On December 25, 1949, the Chaoshan delegate agency supplies section Huang Yijia for the China Communist Party military representative, taking over the school.The school is named Guangdong Jinshan middle school, was December 25 surely Decoration Day ( later renamed on April 7 of each year ).

1950－1978 
In September 1951, Culture and Education Department of Guangdong Province specified the school for the implementation of the "Interim Regulations For Secondary Schools" and "Labor Guardian System" to the pilot unit.

At the beginning of September, 1952, eastern Guangdong Office makes a decision, the school moved to Queshi, Shantou, and  merged with Shantou Private Queguan Middle School, its name is " Guangdong Jinshan middle school ", the school receives the original Queguan Middle School all the school property. On September 24, the school opened. In 1955 July, the failure of the School Department of junior high school, and was renamed " Guangdong Jin Shan Senior High school ".

In 1966, June, Mainland China started the "Cultural Revolution", the school stopped for counties for enrollment. In 1966 September, the school was renamed the "Guangdong Hongyan Middle School". In 1969 December, the school was renamed the Shantou Thirteenth Middle School. In 1978 December, the school was named "Shantou Jinshan Middle School".

1979－2007 
The fall of 1984, the school return to the Shantou area under the jurisdiction of the county enrollment. In June 1985, the Governor of Guangdong Province Ye Xuanping inspection gold in allocated 300,000 yuan to build gold in water supply facilities. The end of 1993, the school was classified as a school of Guangdong Province. Since 1996, schools in April of each year celebration around a week at create section "; to 2008, the school has organized the 13th to create section. 1997, the end of December each year held "Teaching and Research Open Week" activities.In 2003, the school and Jinyiyuan Limited Cooperation, founder of the private school Jinshan Middle School Southern District schools (referred to as the Jin Zhong Nan Xiao).In 2004, the Shantou municipal government site of Shantou City Public Security cadres school was placed under the gold, as gold in the West Campus, as a student dormitory. Gold in the early model high school in Guangdong Province Steering assessment in June 2006 through October 2007, with honors, Guangdong Province, high school teaching level assessment and supervision of acceptance of the model high school in Guangdong Province to confirm. In 2007, the school held 130 Anniversary Celebration, and the issuance of school annals; well-known scholars of the Chinese mainland, the alumni (1930 -1931 studying) Jao Tsung-I Inscription "teach in the southeast" the word gift of gold in the one hundred 30th anniversary; "teach in the southeast" go down in school history.

Famous alumni 

Cai Qiao(1897–1990)
Guo Renyuan(1898–1970)
Dai Pingwan(1903–1945)
Mei Yi(1913–2003)
Jao Tsung-I(1917－2018)

References 

 林伯仰(主编)．李丽丽、许旭文、林运轼、魏崇兴(副主编).［内部发行］教被东南——广东省汕头市金山中学一百三十周年纪念. 2007–4. 金山中学．

External links 

汕头金山中学
金中校友网

J金
J金
Junior secondary schools in China